Kesang Chuki Dorjee is a Bhutanese politician who has been an appointed member of the National Council of Bhutan, since May 2018. Previously, she was an appointed member of the National Council of Bhutan from 2015 to 2018.

References 

Members of the National Council (Bhutan)
Bhutanese women in politics
1976 births
Living people